Torkil may refer to:

People
Torkil Lauritzen, (1901-1979), a Danish actor.
Torkil Nielsen, (born 1964), a Faroese football midfielder.

Other
Torkil, a Turkic tribe of the Middle Ages